The 2009 Korfball European Bowl was the qualifying competition for the 2010 European Korfball Championship, split into two divisions: West, in Luxembourg, and East, in Prievidza (Slovakia). 3 best teams of each division will join the 10 qualified-teams-by-ranking for competing in the European Championship.

East division
The East Division took place in Prievidza (Slovakia) from 31 October to 1 November and the winners were Slovakia. Serbia and Turkey were qualified for European Championships too.

First round

Final round
5th-7th places

Finals

East division final standings

West division
The West Division took place in Luxembourg from 7 to 8 November, and the winners were Wales. Scotland and Ireland were the other teams qualified for the European Championship.

West division final standings

References

External links
West Division
East Division

Korfball European Bowl, 2009
Korfball European Bowl, 2009
Korfball European Bowl
Korfball European Bowl